Dagohoy, officially the Municipality of Dagohoy,  is a 5th class municipality in the province of Bohol, Philippines. According to the 2020 census, it has a population of 19,874 people.

The town is named after Boholano revolutionary Francisco Dagohoy.

The town of Dagohoy, Bohol celebrates its fiesta on 10 February, to honor the town patron Our Lady of Lourdes.

History

On 21 June 1956, the municipality of Dagohoy was created through Executive Order No. 184 issued by President Ramon Magsaysay, becoming the 41st town in the province. 
Former Colonia agricultural colony superintendent Camilo Calceta was appointed first mayor of the town at the age of 84 years.  The barrios constituting the new municipality were:

 from the municipality of Carmen
 Colonia 
 San Vicente 
 Can-oling
 La Esperanza 
 Villa Aurora 
 from the municipality of Ubay
 Babag
 from the municipality of Sierra Bullones
 Caluasan 
 San Miguel 
 Candelaria
 from the municipality of Trinidad
 Mahayag 
 Malitbog 
 Cagawasan
 Santo Rosario

Geography

Barangays
Dagohoy comprises 15 barangays:

Climate

Demographics

Economy

References

Sources

External links

 Municipality of Dagohoy
 Dagohoy

Municipalities of Bohol
Populated places established in 1956
Establishments by Philippine executive order